Sir Charles Richard Blunt, 4th Baronet (6 December 1775 – 29 February 1840) was a British Member of Parliament.

Blunt was the eldest son of Sir Charles William Blunt, 3rd Baronet, and his wife Elizabeth (née Peers), and succeeded his father in the baronetcy in 1802. He served with the East India Company and also represented Lewes in the House of Commons from 1831 until his death. Blunt married Sophia, daughter of Joseph Baker, in 1824. He died in February 1840, aged 64, and was succeeded in his title by his son Walter. Lady Blunt died in 1862.

References

www.thepeerage.com

1775 births
1840 deaths
Baronets in the Baronetage of Great Britain
Members of the Parliament of the United Kingdom for English constituencies
UK MPs 1831–1832
UK MPs 1832–1835
UK MPs 1835–1837
UK MPs 1837–1841